Gurubira spectabilis' is a species of beetle in the family Cerambycidae. It was described by Martins and Napp in 1989.

References

Rhopalophorini
Beetles described in 1989